Hamish Graeme Hardie (born 22 September 1928) is a British sailor. He competed in the 6 Metre event at the 1948 Summer Olympics.

References

External links
 

1928 births
Living people
British male sailors (sport)
Olympic sailors of Great Britain
Sailors at the 1948 Summer Olympics – 6 Metre
Place of birth missing (living people)